Top Model po-ukrainsky, cycle 6  is the sixth season of Top Model po-ukrainsky. The show returned to an all-female format.

Among with the prizes was: a cash prize of 100,000₴, a cover of Pink Magazine in Ukraine, and modelling contract with K Models.

The winner of the competition was 25-year-old Malvina Chuklya.

Amina Dosimbaeva, Anastasiya Leuhina, Katya Chechelenko and Margarita Verhovtseva would later return to compete for the tile in Top Model po-ukrainsky, cycle 7. Anastasiya Leuhina quit the competition in Episode 2 and Katya Chechelenko was disqualified (due to inappropriate behaviour on photoshoot) in the same episode. Amina Dosimbaeva was eliminated in Episode 6. Margo was eliminated in Episode 7.

Contestants 
(ages stated are at start of contest)

Episodes

Episode 1
Original airdate: 

This was the first casting episode.

Episode 2
Original airdate: 

This was the second casting episode.

Episode 3
Original airdate: 

Immune: Malvina Chuklya
Bottom two: Darina Didovich & Karina Dyachuk
Eliminated: Karina Dyachuk

Episode 4
Original airdate: 

Quit: Darina Didovich 
Bottom four Nastya Lazaryeva, Katya Chechelenko, Margo Verhovtseva & Yuliya Binkovska
Quit: Malvina Chuklya
Eliminated: Nastya Lazaryeva

Episode 5
Original airdate: 

Bottom two: Liza Bezkrovna & Nataliya Savchenko
Eliminated: Nataliya Savchenko

Episode 6
Original airdate: 

Immune: Amina Dosimbaeva & Katya Kulichenko
Bottom two: Yuliya Binkovska & Masha Mihyeyeva
Eliminated: Masha Mihyeyeva

Episode 7
Original airdate: 

Returned: Malvina Chuklya
Best photo: Darina Gerasimchuk
Bottom two: Katya Kulichenko & Nastya Leuhina
Eliminated: Nastya Leuhina

Episode 8
Original airdate: 

Immune 1: Natasha Masklovska
Immune 2: Katya Chechelenko 
Immune 3: Yuliya Binkovska
Best photo: Nastya Ruda
Bottom two: Yarina Samarik & Liza Bezkrovna
Eliminated: Yarina Samarik

Episode 9
Original airdate: 

Best photo: Natasha Maslovska
Bottom two: Amina Dosimbaeva & Margo Verhovtseva
Eliminated: Margo Verhovtseva

Episode 10
Original airdate: 

Best photo: Malvina Chuklya
Bottom two: Katya Chechelenko & Liza Bezkrovna
Eliminated: Liza Bezkrovna

Episode 11
Original airdate: 

Best photo: Malvina Chuklya
Bottom two: Katya Kulichenko & Natasha Maslovska
Originally eliminated but saved: Natasha Maslovska

Episode 12
Original airdate: 

Best photo: Katya Chechelenko
Bottom two: Amina Dosimbaeva & Nastya Ruda
Eliminated: Amina Dosimbaeva

Episode 13
Original airdate: 

Best photo: Katya Kulichenko
Eliminated: Yuliya Binkovska

Episode 14
Original airdate: 

Immune: Darina Gerasimchuk
Best photo: Natasha Maslovska
Bottom two: Nastya Ruda & Malvina Chuklya
Eliminated: Nastya Ruda

Episode 15
Original airdate: 

Best photo: Katya Kulichenko
Bottom two: Darina Gerasimchuk & Katya Chechelenko
Eliminated: Darina Gerasimchuk

Episode 16
Original airdate: 

Best photo: Malvina Chuklya
Bottom two: Katya Chechelenko & Natasha Maslovska
Eliminated: Katya Chechelenko

Episode 17
Original airdate: 

Best photo: Katya Kulichenko
Originally eliminated but saved: Natasha Maslovska

Episode 18
Original airdate: 

Bottom two: Malvina Chuklya & Katya Kulichenko
Eliminated: Katya Kulichenko
Final two: Malvina Chuklya & Natasha Maslovska
Ukraine's Next Top Model: Malvina Chuklya

Summaries

Results 

  The contestant was in danger of elimination
  The contestant was eliminated
  The contestant was originally eliminated, but was saved.
  The contestant quit the competition
  The contestant was immune from elimination
  The contestant won best photo
  The contestant won the competition

Photo shoot guide 

 Episode 3 photo shoot: Self styled promo shoot
 Episode 4 photo shoot: Cheerleaders
 Episode 5 photo shoot: Strange poses, Diva on a disco ball
 Episode 6 photo shoot: Road to Graduation
 Episode 7 photo shoot: Bubbles, Cat calendar
 Episode 8 photo shoot: Aliens in the bubble & Black and white ballerina in pairs
 Episode 9 photo shoot: Slumber Party in pairs
 Episode 10 photo shoot: Forest witches; Mermaids with previous male contestant
 Episode 11 photo shoot: Caged Animals
 Episode 12 photo shoot: Princess on the carriage; Swapping Responsibilities
 Episode 13 photo shoot: Anti-stress
 Episode 14 photo shoot: Romance with Irakli Makatsaria; Anime style on stilts
 Episode 15 photo shoot: Hanging on a rope ladder from a hot air balloon
 Episode 16 photo shoot: Turkish Brides
 Episode 17 photo shoot: Powdered Spices
 Episode 18 photo shoot: Satno Muerto

References 

Ukraine
2018 Ukrainian television seasons